Achampatti is a village in the Budhalur taluk of Thanjavur district, Tamil Nadu, India.

Demographics 

As per the 2001 census, Achampatti had a total population of 1545 with 777 males and 768 females. The sex ratio was 988. The literacy rate was 49.85.

References 

 

Villages in Thanjavur district